The Turkey national under-20 basketball team is the national representative for Turkey in men's international under-20 basketball tournaments. They are formed and run by the Turkish Basketball Federation. The team competes at the FIBA U20 European Championship.

FIBA U20 European Championship

Squad
2014 FIBA Europe Under-20 Championship - Gold medal
Deniz Çevik, Doğukan Şanlı, Cedi Osman, Metin Türen, Metecan Birsen, Emircan Koşut, Efekan Coşar, Kartal Özmızrak, Berk Demir, Talat Altunbey, Muhsin Yaşar, Tayfun Erülkü - Head coach: Erhan Toker

2015 FIBA Europe Under-20 Championship - Bronze medal
Berk Uğurlu, Doğukan Şanlı, Doğuş Özdemiroğlu, Ege Arar, Metecan Birsen, Emircan Koşut, Tolga Gecim, Kartal Özmızrak, Berk Demir, Okben Ulubay, Muhsin Yaşar, Mert Celep - Head coach: Taner Günay

2016 FIBA Europe Under-20 Championship - Bronze medal
Berk Uğurlu, Doğuş Özdemiroğlu, Ege Arar, Egemen Güven, Kadir Bayram, Mert Çevik, Metehan Akyel, Oğulcan Baykan, Okben Ulubay, Ömer Yurtseven, Tolga Gecim, Yiğit Arslan  - Head coach: Ömer Uğurata

FIBA Under-21 World Championship

See also
Turkey men's national under-18 and under-19 basketball team
Turkey men's national under-16 and under-17 basketball team
Turkey men's national basketball team

References

External links
Official website 
FIBA profile

Men's U20
M U20
Men's national under-20 basketball teams